Ambalathara  is a village in Kasaragod district in the state of Kerala, India.

Demographics
 India census, Ambalathara had a population of 9138 with 4291 males and 4847 females.

Transportation
Local roads have access to NH.66 which connects to Mangalore in the north and Calicut in the south. The nearest railway station is Kanhangad on Mangalore-Palakkad line. There are airports at Mangalore and Kannur.

References

Kanhangad area